Digama pandaensis is a moth of the family Erebidae first described by Romieux in 1935. It is found in Africa, including Zaire.

References

Aganainae
Moths described in 1935